Heredofamilial amyloidosis is an inherited condition that may be characterized by systemic or localized deposition of amyloid in body tissues.

See also 
 Amyloidosis
 List of cutaneous conditions

References 

Skin conditions resulting from errors in metabolism